Andha Oru Nimidam is a 1985 Tamil-language thriller film directed and written by Major Sundarrajan. The film stars Kamal Haasan and Urvashi  while Jayamalini, Thengai Srinivasan and Pandari Bai play supporting roles. It was released on 31 May 1985.

Plot 

Kumar is a lawyer by profession and also actively involved in social work. He falls in love with Vasanthi, a village girl and her grandfather works as housekeeper/car driver in Raj Shekhar's house. One day Raj Shekhar murders his friend/partner Madan and cunningly puts the blame on the grandfather who is arrested and put behind bars. He manages to escape from prison one night to kill Raj Shekhar, but is murdered by Raj Shekhar in front of Kumar and Vasanthi instead. Kumar tries his best to prove in court that Raj Shekar is guilty but loses the case as there is no proper proof of Raj Shekar's guilt. Kumar, with the help of Vasanthi start investigating and gathering evidence of the murders of Madan and the grandfather. Kumar's family and his lady love, Vasanthi, are put in danger as he tries to prove Raj Shaekar's guilt. How does Kumar catch the culprit Raj Shekhar? What happens to the love of Kumar and Vasanthi? The climax reveals all these answers.

Cast 
 Kamal Haasan as Kumar
 Urvashi as Vasanthi
 Major Sundarrajan as Rajasekar
 Y. G. Mahendran as Balu
 Thengai Srinivasan as Seenu
 Jayamalini
 Anuradha
 Pandari Bai as Radha
 Venu Arvind as Inspector Raju
 Saleema as Archana

Production 
Sundarrajan, in addition to directing, also played the main antagonist. A day's production schedule was cancelled because of the assassination of Indira Gandhi.

Soundtrack 
The music was composed by Ilaiyaraaja and Tamil lyrics were written by Vairamuthu, Gangai Amaran and Na. Kamarajan. The songs were composed at a place near Aliyar Dam. The orchestration for "Siriya Paravai" was finished by Ilaiyaraaja in half an hour.

References

External links 
 

1980s Tamil-language films
1985 films
1985 thriller films
Films directed by Major Sundarrajan
Films scored by Ilaiyaraaja
Indian thriller films